Raphael Matos (born August 28, 1981) is a Brazilian professional racing driver. He was the 2008 Firestone Indy Lights Series champion and the 2007 Champ Car Atlantic Series champion. He lives in Miami.

Career highlights

Early career
Born in Belo Horizonte, Matos came to the United States in 2002 after karting in Brazil and began competing in Skip Barber Formula Dodge, winning the championship in 2003. In 2004, he moved up to the Star Mazda Series and in 2005 he won the Star Mazda championship. In 2006 he moved up the Champ Car Atlantic Championship Series where he drove for the Sierra Sierra team and captured one victory on his way to 4th place in the points standings.
He also competed in 4 Indy Pro Series races for Guthrie Racing and swept the two races held in March at St. Petersburg, Florida. During the fall he was named a driver for A1 Team Brazil in the A1 Grand Prix series and made his debut at the series' race in Beijing in the 2006–2007 season. He raced a Lola B07/40-Mazda in the 2007 12 Hours of Sebring and the 2007 Petit Le Mans.

Atlantics championship and Indy Lights
Matos continued with the Sierra Sierra team in Atlantics in 2007 and clinched the championship with several races remaining in the season, securing for himself the $2 million "scholarship" for a ride in Champ Car for the 2008 season.

However, Matos decided to pass on the scholarship and sign with Andretti Green Racing to drive in the Indy Racing League's Firestone Indy Lights Series in 2008, where he won the series championship.

Prior to the 2008 Indy Lights season, he drove a Mazda RX-8 for the SpeedSource team in the Rolex 24 at Daytona, taking first in the GT class and a 9th place overall finish, sharing the car with Nick Ham, David Haskell and Sylvain Tremblay.  After the season, he drove for Michael Shank Racing on the winning team in the DP class (with Ian James and John Pew) at the SunRichGourmet.com 1000 at Miller Motorsports Park.

IndyCar Series

Matos competed in the full 2009 IndyCar Series season for Luczo-Dragon Racing. He qualified third in his second race, the Long Beach Grand Prix and finished eight. He was the fastest rookie qualifier in his first Indy 500 and ran in the lead pack, but had a crash with Vítor Meira in which Meira was injured. Matos finished 22nd.  Matos captured seasonal Rookie of the Year honors by a wide margin over former F1 driver Robert Doornbos. Matos' best finish was 6th at the Milwaukee Mile. He was running at the finish of each of the last ten races of the season, consistency that led to 13th in the championship despite few top ten finishes.  Raphael qualified 12th in both the 2009 and 2010 Indy 500 and he also crashed in both races in roughly the same location at the exit of turn 1. He failed to qualify the AFS entry for the 2011 Indianapolis 500.
He was also the fastest Rookie during the 2009 Indy 500 qualifying.

Post-Indy career
Matos returned to his native Brazil, racing in the Stock Car Brasil series; at the end of the 2015 season, he received a two-year suspension for failing a drug test. He has since raced in the Trans-Am Series in the United States.

Motorsports career results

American Le Mans Series

A1 Grand Prix
(key) (Races in bold indicate pole position) (Races in italics indicate fastest lap)

American open–wheel racing
(key)  (Races in bold indicate pole position) (Races in italics indicate fastest lap)

Atlantic Championship

Indy Lights

IndyCar Series

Indianapolis 500

Stock Car Brasil

† Ineligible for championship points.
 Season still in progress

References

External links
 
 
 IndyCar Driver Page
 Champ Car Atlantic Series bio

Living people
1981 births
Sportspeople from Belo Horizonte
Brazilian racing drivers
Stock Car Brasil drivers
Indianapolis 500 drivers
24 Hours of Daytona drivers
IndyCar Series drivers
Indy Lights champions
Indy Lights drivers
Brazilian IndyCar Series drivers
Atlantic Championship drivers
Indy Pro 2000 Championship drivers
A1 Team Brazil drivers
American Le Mans Series drivers
Rolex Sports Car Series drivers
Brazilian WeatherTech SportsCar Championship drivers
Trans-Am Series drivers
Dragon Racing drivers
A1 Grand Prix drivers
Andretti Autosport drivers
AFS Racing drivers
De Ferran Motorsports drivers
Level 5 Motorsports drivers
Starworks Motorsport drivers
Meyer Shank Racing drivers
Charouz Racing System drivers